The 1988 Asian Taekwondo Championships were the 8th edition of the Asian Taekwondo Championships, and were held in Kathmandu, Nepal from 23 to 25 March, 1988.

Medal summary

Men

Women

Medal table

References

Results

External links
Results

Asian Championships
Asian Taekwondo Championships
Asian Taekwondo Championships
Taekwondo Championships